Hotel Hollywood is a comedy horror thriller about a wedding party which checks into a hotel and is never seen again. The film is written and directed by Param Gill. It stars Param Gill, Arsh Singh, Mehr Hassan and Rahul Nath in the lead roles.
The film score and soundtrack is composed by Shyam Vai.

Plot
The film is reportedly "inspired by a true story". When at the heights of the 2009 swine flu pandemic, a hotel in Hong Kong was quarantined for one week.

References

External links
 

2010 films
2010s Hindi-language films
2010s English-language films